Scott William Martin Tupper (born December 16, 1986) is a Canadian former male field hockey player who played as a defender.

Club career
Born in Vancouver, British Columbia, Tupper first started playing with the Vancouver Hawks Field Hockey Club at the age of eight. Scott Tupper is known for his deadly drag flicks and short corners. Vancouver's one and only Field Hockey Iron Man. In the last few years, he's played mainly as a Central Defender, capable of launching 50-yard aerial passes to his forwards. His home club is the West Vancouver Field Hockey Club. He's also played semi-professionally in Europe with HC Schaerweijde, Der Club an der Alster and Racing Bruxelles.

International career
In 2016, he was named to Canada's Olympic team. In June 2019, he was selected in the Canada squad for the 2019 Pan American Games. They won the silver medal as they lost 5–2 to Argentina in the final.

In June 2021, Tupper was named to Canada's 2020 Summer Olympics team. After the 2020 Summer Olympics he retired from the national program as the top goalscorer with 126 goals.

References

External links

1986 births
Living people
Canadian male field hockey players
Male field hockey defenders
Field hockey players at the 2008 Summer Olympics
2010 Men's Hockey World Cup players
Field hockey players at the 2011 Pan American Games
Field hockey players at the 2014 Commonwealth Games
Field hockey players at the 2015 Pan American Games
Field hockey players at the 2016 Summer Olympics
Field hockey players at the 2020 Summer Olympics
2018 Men's Hockey World Cup players
Field hockey players at the 2019 Pan American Games
Olympic field hockey players of Canada
Commonwealth Games competitors for Canada
Field hockey players from Vancouver
Pan American Games gold medalists for Canada
Pan American Games silver medalists for Canada
Pan American Games medalists in field hockey
West Vancouver Field Hockey Club players
Der Club an der Alster players
Medalists at the 2011 Pan American Games
Medalists at the 2015 Pan American Games
Medalists at the 2019 Pan American Games
Royal Racing Club Bruxelles players